Sagri is a village in Dina Tehsil of Jhelum District

External links
 http://www.cellsaa.com/post-code-area/SAGRI
 http://pk.geoview.info/sagri,1166594#s
 https://schoolsonline.britishcouncil.org/taxonomy/term/229514

Populated places in Tehsil Dina